Großhabersdorf is a municipality in the district of Fürth, Bavaria, Germany. As of 2020 it had a population of 4,377.

Town twinning 
  Święciechowa, Poland
  Aixe-sur-Vienne, France
  Malinska, Croatia

References

External links
Official Website 

Fürth (district)